Karakulov is a masculine surname, its feminine counterpart is Karakulova. Notable people with the surname include:

Kuanysh Karakulov (born 1977), Kazakhstani football player 
Nikolay Karakulov (1918–1988), Soviet sprinter

Russian-language surnames